The JOrchestra is a symphony orchestra based in Amman, Jordan.

The orchestra rebranded as JOrchestra in 2015. It was formerly known as the Amman Symphony Orchestra (ASO).

See also
 Cairo Symphony Orchestra, Egypt
 National Music Conservatory, Amman, Jordan

References

External links
 

2015 establishments in Jordan
Musical groups established in 2015
Symphony orchestras
Jordanian musical groups
Organisations based in Amman